James Freeman is an American journalist specializing in economics, assistant editorial page editor at The Wall Street Journal, and author.

Freeman is a graduate of Yale College.  After graduation, he served as investor advocate at the U.S. Securities and Exchange Commission

Freeman is co-author with Vern McKinley of Borrowed Time: Two Centuries of Booms, Busts and Bailouts at Citi,  a 2018 history of Citigroup.  The Financial Times describes it as a "rollicking" tale "of hubris, over-reach and outright catastrophe" which is especially "excellent" on "the US economy in the 19th century, and the extent to which it relied on cotton, an 'economy . . . built on America’s original sin, the monstrous institution of slavery'".

He is also the co author with Maria Bartiromo of a book titled The Cost: Trump, China, and American Renewal which was published by Simon & Schuster in October 2020.

He is the son of Neal B. Freeman.

References

Yale College alumni
The Wall Street Journal people
Year of birth missing (living people)
Living people
American male journalists